Peter Leo Knecht, September 19, 1936 – October 3, 2014, was a criminal defense attorney from Los Angeles, California.  During his career, he represented many Hollywood and music-biz celebrities, including sentenced Rock Star David Crosby. (https://news.google.com/newspapers?id=FqIrAAAAIBAJ&pg=1972,December 15, 2010 and The Daily Telegraph September 22, 1982.

Knecht eventually moved to the defense side of the law, primarily through his affiliation with the law practice of Harry Weiss. (Jeffrey Toobin, "The run of his life: the people v. O.J. Simpson,1997", Simon & Schuster) Knecht appeared as a television analyst and consultant on criminal justice for major broadcast news outlets, including CBS, NBC, ABC, FOX, CNN, and local networks such as KCAL-TV Channel 9 and KCOP-TV Channel 13.  He also appeared on 'Celebrity Justice”. His major cases have been featured on morning talk shows like The NBC Today Show and ABC “Good Morning America”.

Personal life

Knecht was married to Ava Cadell from 1992 until his death. He died on October 3, 2014, at his home in California from cancer. http://www.malibutimes.com/obituaries/article_7fee8f7a-4f2f-11e4-aa31-573581e36726.html

Filmography

References

2014 deaths
1936 births
California lawyers
Criminal defense lawyers
20th-century American lawyers